Danny Barnes may refer to:

Danny Barnes (baseball) (born 1989), American baseball player
Danny Barnes (musician) (born 1961), American musician
Danny Barnes (rugby league), English rugby league footballer
Danny Barnes (rugby union) (born 1989), Irish rugby union footballer